Neverwhere is a 1996 television series by Neil Gaiman.

Neverwhere may also refer to:
Neverwhere (novel), a 1996 novelization of the series by Neil Gaiman
Neverwhere (radio play), a 2013 radio adaptation of the series
Neverwhere (1968), a 1968 short film by Richard Corben